In organic chemistry, the diazo group is an organic moiety consisting of two linked nitrogen atoms (azo) at the terminal position.  Overall charge-neutral organic compounds containing the diazo group bound to a carbon atom are called diazo compounds or diazoalkanes and are described by the general structural formula . The simplest example of a diazo compound is diazomethane, .  Diazo compounds should not be confused with azo compounds or with diazonium compounds.

Structure 
The electronic structure of diazo compounds is characterized by π electron density delocalized over the α-carbon and two nitrogen atoms, along with an orthogonal π system with electron density delocalized over only the terminal nitrogen atoms.  Because all octet rule-satisfying resonance forms of diazo compounds have formal charges, they are members of a class of compounds known as 1,3-dipoles.  Some of the most stable diazo compounds are α-diazo-β-diketones and α-diazo-β-diesters, in which the electron density is further delocalized into an electron-withdrawing carbonyl group.  In contrast, most diazoalkanes without electron-withdrawing substituents, including diazomethane itself, are explosive. A commercially relevant diazo compound is ethyl diazoacetate (N2CHCOOEt). A group of isomeric compounds with only few similar properties are the diazirines, where the carbon and two nitrogens are linked as a ring.

Four resonance structures can be drawn:

Compounds with the diazo moiety should be distinguished from diazonium compounds, which have the same terminal azo group but bear an overall positive charge, and azo compounds in which the azo group bridges two organic substituents.

History 
Diazo compounds were first produced by Peter Griess who had discovered a versatile new chemical reaction, as detailed in his 1858 paper "Preliminary notice on the influence of nitrous acid on aminonitro- and aminodinitrophenol."

Synthesis
Several methods exist for the preparation of diazo compounds.

From amines
Alpha-acceptor-substituted primary aliphatic amines R-CH2-NH2 (R = COOR, CN, CHO, COR) react with nitrous acid to generate the diazo compound.

From diazomethyl compounds
An example of an electrophilic substitution using a diazomethyl compound is that of a reaction between an acyl halide and diazomethane, for example the first step in the Arndt-Eistert synthesis.

By diazo transfer
In diazo transfer certain carbon acids react with tosyl azide in the presence of a weak base like triethylamine or DBU.  The byproduct is the corresponding tosylamide (p-toluenesulfonamide).  This reaction is also called the Regitz diazo transfer. Examples are the synthesis of tert-butyl diazoacetate and diazomalonate. Methyl phenyldiazoacetate is generated in this way by treating methyl phenylacetate with p-acetamidobenzenesulfonyl azide in the presence of base.

The mechanism involves attack of the enolate at the terminal nitrogen, proton transfer, and expulsion of the anion of the sulfonamide.  Use of the β-carbonyl aldehyde leads to a deformylative variant of the Regitz transfer, which is useful for the preparation of diazo compounds stabilized by only one carbonyl group.

From N-alkyl-N-nitroso compounds
Diazo compounds can be obtained in an elimination reaction of N-alkyl-N-nitroso compounds, such as in the synthesis of diazomethane from Diazald or MNNG:

(The mechanism shown here is one possibility.  For an alternative mechanism for the analogous formation of diazomethane from an N-nitrososulfonamide, see the page on Diazald.)

From hydrazones
Hydrazones are oxidized (dehydrogenation) for example with silver oxide or mercury oxide for example the synthesis of 2-diazopropane from acetone hydrazone. Other oxidizing reagents are lead tetraacetate, manganese dioxide and the Swern reagent. Tosyl hydrazones RRC=N-NHTs are reacted with base for example triethylamine in the synthesis of crotyl diazoacetate and in the synthesis of phenyldiazomethane from PhCHNHTs and sodium methoxide.

Reaction of a carbonyl group with the hydrazine 1,2-bis(tert-butyldimethylsilyl)hydrazine to form the hydrazone is followed by reaction with the iodane difluoroiodobenzene yields the diazo compound:

From azides
One method is described for the synthesis of diazo compounds from azides using phosphines:

Reactions

In cycloadditions
Diazo compounds react as 1,3-dipoles in diazoalkane 1,3-dipolar cycloadditions.

As carbene precursors
Diazo compounds are used as precursors to carbenes, which are generated by thermolysis or photolysis, for example in the Wolff rearrangement. As such they are used in cyclopropanation for example in the reaction of ethyl diazoacetate with styrene. Certain diazo compounds can couple to form alkenes in a formal carbene dimerization reaction.

Diazo compounds are intermediates in the Bamford-Stevens reaction of tosylhydrazones to alkenes, again with a carbene intermediate:

In the Doyle-Kirmse reaction certain diazo compounds react with allyl sulfides to the homoallyl sulfide. Intramolecular reactions of diazocarbonyl compounds provide access to cyclopropanes. In the Buchner ring expansion diazo compounds react with aromatic rings with ring-expansion.

As nucleophile
The Buchner-Curtius-Schlotterbeck reaction yields ketones from aldehydes and aliphatic diazo compounds:

The reaction type is nucleophilic addition.

Occurrence in nature
Two families of naturally occurring products feature the diazo group: kinamycin and lomaiviticin. These molecules are DNA-intercalators, with diazo functionality as their "warheads". Loss of N2, induced reductively, generates a DNA-cleaving fluorenyl radical.

See also
 Azo compound
 Diazoalkane 1,3-dipolar cycloaddition
 Diazonium compound
 Reprography
 Whiteprint

Notes

References

Functional groups